In mathematics, de Moivre's formula  (also known as de Moivre's theorem and de Moivre's identity) states that for any real number  and integer  it holds that

where  is the imaginary unit. The formula is named after Abraham de Moivre, although he never stated it in his works.

The formula is important because it connects complex numbers and trigonometry.

As written, the formula is not valid for non-integer powers . However, there are generalizations of this formula valid for other exponents. These can be used to give explicit expressions for the th roots of unity, that is, complex numbers  such that .

Example

or equivalently that

In this example, it is easy to check the validity of the equation by multiplying out the left side.

Relation to Euler's formula
De Moivre's formula is a precursor to Euler's formula

which establishes the fundamental relationship between the trigonometric functions and the complex exponential function. 

One can derive de Moivre's formula using Euler's formula and the exponential law for integer powers

since Euler's formula implies that the left side is equal to  while the right side is equal to

Proof by induction 
The truth of de Moivre's theorem can be established by using mathematical induction for natural numbers, and extended to all integers from there. For an integer , call the following statement :

For , we proceed by mathematical induction.  is clearly true. For our hypothesis, we assume  is true for some natural . That is, we assume

Now, considering :

See angle sum and difference identities.

We deduce that  implies . By the principle of mathematical induction it follows that the result is true for all natural numbers. Now,  is clearly true since .

The equation (*) is a result of the identity

Hence,  holds for all integers .

Formulae for cosine and sine individually 

For an equality of complex numbers, one necessarily has equality both of the real parts and of the imaginary parts of both members of the equation. This formula was given by 16th century French mathematician François Viète:

In each of these two equations, the final trigonometric function equals one or minus one or zero, thus removing half the entries in each of the sums.

Failure for non-integer powers, and generalization 
De Moivre's formula does not hold for non-integer powers. The derivation of de Moivre's formula above involves a complex number raised to the integer power . If a complex number is raised to a non-integer power, the result is multiple-valued (see failure of power and logarithm identities). For example, when , de Moivre's formula gives the following results:

for  the formula gives , and
for  the formula gives .

This assigns two different values for the same expression , so the formula is not consistent in this case.

On the other hand, the values 1 and −1 are both square roots of 1.

is multi-valued while

is not. However, it is always the case that

is one of the values of

Roots of complex numbers
A modest extension of the version of de Moivre's formula given in this article can be used to find the th roots of a complex number (equivalently, the power of ).

If  is a complex number, written in polar form as

 

 

This formula is also sometimes known as de Moivre's formula.

Analogues in other settings

Hyperbolic trigonometry

Since , an analog to de Moivre's formula also applies to the hyperbolic trigonometry. For all integers ,

Extension to complex numbers

The formula holds for any complex number 

where

Quaternions

To find the roots of a quaternion there is an analogous form of de Moivre's formula. A quaternion in the form

can be represented in the form

In this representation,

and the trigonometric functions are defined as

In the case that ,

that is, the unit vector. This leads to the variation of De Moivre's formula:

Example
To find the cube roots of

write the quaternion in the form

Then the cube roots are given by:

matrices 
Consider the following matrix
. Then . This fact (although it can be proven in the very same way as for complex numbers) is a direct consequence of the fact that the space of matrices of type  is isomorphic to the complex plane.

References 
.

External links 
 De Moivre's Theorem for Trig Identities by Michael Croucher, Wolfram Demonstrations Project.

Theorems in complex analysis
Articles containing proofs